Novosyolka is a rural locality (a village) in Slednevskoye Rural Settlement, Alexandrovsky District, Vladimir Oblast, Russia. The population was 12 as of 2010. There are 3 streets.

Geography 
The village is located 13 km north-east from Slednevo, 6 km north from Alexandrov.

References 

Rural localities in Alexandrovsky District, Vladimir Oblast